Chiwaukum Lake is an alpine freshwater lake located on the Ewing Basin south of Lake Donald and the McCue Ridge in King County, Washington. Because of its proximity to surrounding peaks and mountains at the heart of the Alpine Lakes Wilderness, the lake is a popular area for hiking. Outflow from Chiwaukum Lake is Chiwaukum Creek and an unnamed creek flows into Chiwaukim Lake from Larch Lake. A short distance north of Donald Lake are other Scottish Lakes including Loch Eileen and Lake Julius.

Climate
Chikamin Lake is located in a hemiboreal climate, part of the marine west coast climate zone of western North America.

See also 
 List of lakes of the Alpine Lakes Wilderness
 Chiwaukum Mountains

References

Lakes of Washington (state)
Lakes of Chelan County, Washington